Kelleway is a surname. Notable people with the surname include:

 Charlie Kelleway (1886–1944), Australian cricketer
 Lionel Kelleway (born 1944), British radio presenter

See also
 Kellaway

Surnames of British Isles origin